"Barbie Tingz" is a song recorded by rapper Nicki Minaj. It is solely written by Minaj and produced by Jeremy Reid, similarly to "Chun-Li". According to Minaj, Reid's name was added to the writing credits for adlibs and production. It was released as a single by Young Money Entertainment and Cash Money Records on April 12, 2018, alongside "Chun-Li". It was included as a bonus track on the Target and Japanese exclusive versions of Minaj's fourth studio album, Queen (2018).

Release
On April 10, 2018, Minaj revealed the cover art for the song on social media, alongside "Chun-Li". The song was released on April 12, 2018, through Young Money Entertainment and Cash Money Records as a single.

Music video

The official music video directed by Minaj and Giovanni Bianco of Serial Pictures was released on May 4, 2018. It features Minaj in various outfits and choreography. The video has 114 Million views on YouTube as of February  2022.

Critical reception
Bianca Gracie in Billboard called it a "juicy braggadocious anthem laid atop a throwback production by Chevy Music that is pure New York City" and stated that it's reminiscent of the Litefeet dance era, "the bars are filled with Minaj's signature themes: boasting about her vagina, calling out jealous women and aiming shots at her rap enemies." Jon Caraminaca on The New York Times said, "these are sparring records—loose, pugnacious, a little uncentered. "Barbie Tingz" has the cold snap of early '80s hip-hop and electro ... As is the norm, Ms. Minaj aims shots at unnamed antagonists, but in the past, that bluster felt truly targetless. But now, for the first time since the beginning of her career, there's someone who might plausibly shoot back, and win." Maeve McDermott of USA Today said, "Barbie Tingz is the real highlight of the two tracks, a welcome reminder of Nicki's addictive flow over a beat that sounds made for summertime radio play."

Commercial performance 
"Barbie Tingz" debuted at number 83 on the U.S. Billboard Hot 100 after a day of tracking and four days of radio airplay, with 21,000 downloads sold and 4.2 million streams. It ascended to number 25 the following week, selling 29,000 copies and earning 18 million streams. It fell to number 78 in its third week. The song managed to peak at number one in New Zealand's Heatseekers chart.

Credits and personnel
Credits adapted from Tidal.
 Chevy Music – production
 Laura Bates – mixing assistance, record engineering assistance
 Ivan Jimenez – record engineering assistance
 Aubry "Big Juice" Delaine – mixing, record engineering
 Labrinth – record engineering

Charts

Certifications

References

Nicki Minaj songs
Songs written by Nicki Minaj
Cash Money Records singles
Young Money Entertainment singles
2018 songs